Cao Guojiu, literally Imperial Brother-in-law  Cao, is a Chinese mythological figure and one of the Eight Immortals in the Taoist pantheon. His real name was Cao Yi while his courtesy name was Jingxiu, and he was better known to his contemporaries as Cao Jingxiu.

Cao Guojiu is believed to be a descendant of Cao Bin, a general of the early Song dynasty, and a younger brother of Empress Cao, the wife of Emperor Renzong of the Song dynasty. As none of Emperor Renzong's sons survived their father, the emperor designated a younger male relative, who later became Emperor Yingzong, as his successor. As such, Cao could not have been a maternal uncle of Emperor Yingzong, so his "Imperial Uncle" status seemed ambiguous. However, as the Chinese character jiu, which means "maternal uncle", can also mean "wife's brother", it is believed that the latter meaning should apply to Cao. In other words, Cao was the "Imperial Brother-in-Law" of Emperor Renzong rather than an "Imperial (Maternal) Uncle" of any Song dynasty emperor.

Cao's younger brother, Cao Jingzhi, abused his relationship with the imperial family by bullying others and engaging in corrupt practices. Cao  tried to persuade his brother to change his ways but he did not listen. In the meantime, he also used his family fortune to help the poor and tried to make up for his brother's misdeeds. One day, Cao Jingzhi was accused by other officials in the imperial court of corruption and abuse of power. Cao felt so ashamed and disappointed by his brother's misconduct that he gave up his official career and went to the countryside to lead a reclusive life. During this time, he met the immortals Zhongli Quan and Lü Dongbin, who taught him Taoist magical arts. After many years of practice and cultivation, Cao himself also became an immortal.

Cao is often depicted dressed in official robes and holding a jade tablet or paiban (clapper). He is also regarded as the patron deity of acting and theatre.

Modern references
In the television show Jackie Chan Adventures, Cao was shown to be the Immortal who sealed away Tchang Zu, The Thunder Demon.  He was depicted as missing his lower right leg, seemingly mistaken for Li Tieguai, and was instead later revealed as the Immortal who first sealed away Bai Tza, The Water Demon by way of the gourd that Uncle used to later seal her away permanently.

Health gods
Eight Immortals
Arts gods